is a Japanese judoka.

She is the gold medallist of the 2014 Judo Grand Slam Tokyo in the +78 kg category.

References

External links
 

1993 births
Living people
Japanese female judoka
Judoka at the 2014 Asian Games
Asian Games silver medalists for Japan
Asian Games medalists in judo
Medalists at the 2014 Asian Games
21st-century Japanese women